"Midsummer Madness" is a song by musical collective 88rising, featuring Japanese singer Joji, Indonesian rapper Rich Brian, Chinese hip-hop group Higher Brothers, and American singer AUGUST 08. The single was released on 7 June 2018 by 88rising Records and 12Tone Music Group as the debut single from their album, Head In The Clouds.

Music video
A music video for the song was released the same day. Directed by Warwick Saint, the video surrounds around the 88rising collective at various points in time. The collective is shown dancing at a party while at the same time, videos of the collective, either at the beach or during their time on tour, is shown to exhibit highlights of the groups time together.

Remixes
A remix of the song by KRANE was released as a single on 25 September 2018.

Another remix of the song was released by the Venezuelan singer, graphic designer and producer, of Latin music, reggaeton, dancehall and moombahton, Daniel Alejandro Morales Reyes, better known as Danny Ocean as a single on August 14, 2020, entitled, "Midsummer Madness 20".

Charts

Certifications

References

2018 songs
2018 singles
Songs written by Rich Brian